Georgios Simiriotis (1886 - unknown) was a Greek tennis player, who won a silver medal in the mixed doubles event at the 1906 Intercalated Games. He also won multiple  events in 1906 and 1908.

Career
At the 1906 Intercalated Games, Simiriotis competed with Sofia Marinou in the mixed doubles tennis event. They lost to eventual winners Max and Marie Decugis, and were awarded a silver medal. In the men's singles event, he lost his quarter final match to Gerard Scheurleer. Simiriotis also took part in one of the fencing competitions at the Games.

Simiriotis won the singles event at the 1906 and 1908 . He also won the men's doubles event at the 1906 Championships alongside , and in 1908 alongside . He won the mixed doubles event at the 1906 Championships alongside Lena Paspati, and in 1908 alongside Sofia Marinou.

Personal life
Simiriotis' mother descended from the family of Georgios Zariphis. His sister Esmée Simirioti also competed at the 1906 Intercalated Games in tennis, winning the Women's singles event. It is believed that Simiriotis was also related to Sofia Marinou.

Notes

References

External links
 Sports Reference

Greek male tennis players
Medalists at the 1906 Intercalated Games
1886 births
Year of death unknown
Tennis players at the 1906 Intercalated Games